Tripura Ganatantrik Manch is a splinter group of Janganotantrik Morcha, which itself is a splinter group of Communist Party of India (Marxist) in Tripura.

The leader of Tripura Ganatantrik Manch is Ajoy Biswas.

TGM participates in the Confederation of Indian Communists and Democratic Socialists.

Political parties in Tripura
Political parties with year of establishment missing